General elections were held in Sierra Leone on 15 May 1973. The result was a victory for the All People's Congress, which won 84 of the 85 elected seats. However, the main opposition, the Sierra Leone People's Party boycotted the election due to violence and alleged irregularities, and most APC candidates were elected unopposed.

Results

References

Elections in Sierra Leone
Sierra Leone
1973 in Sierra Leone
Election and referendum articles with incomplete results